In bioinformatics, the general feature format (gene-finding format, generic feature format, GFF) is a file format used for describing genes and other features of DNA, RNA and protein sequences.

GFF Versions
The following versions of GFF exist:
 General Feature Format Version 2, generally deprecated
 Gene Transfer Format 2.2, a derivative used by Ensembl 
Generic Feature Format Version 3
 Genome Variation Format, with additional pragmas and attributes for sequence_alteration features

GFF2/GTF had a number of deficiencies, notably that it can only represent two-level feature hierarchies and thus cannot handle the three-level hierarchy of gene → transcript → exon. GFF3 addresses this and other deficiencies. For example, it supports arbitrarily many hierarchical levels, and gives specific meanings to certain tags in the attributes field.

The GTF is identical to GFF, version 2.

GFF general structure
All GFF formats (GFF2, GFF3 and GTF) are tab delimited with 9 fields per line. They all share the same structure for the first 7 fields, while differing in the content and format of the ninth field. Some field names have been changed in GFF3 to avoid confusion.  For example, the "seqid" field was formerly referred to as "sequence", which may be confused with a nucleotide or amino acid chain.  The general structure is as follows:

The 8th field: phase of CDS features

Simply put, CDS means "CoDing Sequence". The exact meaning of the term is defined by Sequence Ontology (SO). According to the GFF3 specification:

Meta Directives 
In GFF files, additional meta information can be included and follows after the ## directive. This meta information can detail GFF version, sequence region, or species (full list of meta data types can be found at Sequence Ontology specifications).

GFF software

Servers
Servers that generate this format:

Clients
Clients that use this format:

Validation
The modENCODE project hosts an online GFF3 validation tool with generous limits of 286.10 MB and 15 million lines.

The Genome Tools software collection contains a gff3validator tool that can be used offline to validate and possibly tidy GFF3 files. An online validation service is also available.

See also
 Distributed Annotation System
 Variant Call Format
 Sequence alignment

References

Computer file formats
Bioinformatics